Simnia arcuata, common name Vidler's simnia, is a species of sea snail, a marine gastropod mollusk in the family Ovulidae, the ovulids, cowry allies or false cowries.

Description
The size of an adult shell varies between 8 mm and 26 mm.

Distribution
This species occurs in the Pacific Ocean off the Galapagos Islands and from California to Peru.

References

 Lorenz F. & Fehse D. (2009) The living Ovulidae. A manual of the families of allied cowries: Ovulidae, Pediculariidae and Eocypraeidae. Hackenheim: Conchbooks.

External links
 

Ovulidae
Gastropods described in 1865